Corzo is a surname. Notable people with the surname include:

Aldo Corzo (born 1989), Peruvian footballer
Juan Corzo (1873–1941), Spanish–Cuban chess master 
Juan Manuel Corzo Román (born 1961), Colombian lawyer and politician
Miguel Angel Corzo (born 1942), Mexican-born American arts administrator
Ramiro Suárez Corzo (born 1960), Colombian politician
Silvia Corzo (born 1973), Colombian lawyer and presenter
Teófilo Torres Corzo (born 1946), Mexican politician